The Northern League is an ice hockey league in the United Kingdom, contested by teams from England, Wales and Scotland.  Named for the Northern League which existed in the 1960s and 1970s, it was founded in 2005 in the same format as the defunct Border League.  The English and Welsh teams also play in the English National Hockey League.

Current Teams
 Fife Flyers
 Solway Sharks
 Whitley Warriors
 Sheffield Spartans
 Blackburn Hawks
 TDC Northern Stars
 Flintshire Freeze

Withdrawn Teams
 Bradford Bulldogs

Professional ice hockey leagues in the United Kingdom